The Bryan Simpson United States Courthouse is a courthouse and U.S. federal government facility in Jacksonville, Florida. It houses:
The United States District Court for the Middle District of Florida, Jacksonville Division, and corresponding offices of the United States Bankruptcy Court for the Middle District of Florida and the United States Attorney for the Middle District of Florida.
A satellite office of the United States Court of Appeals for the Eleventh Circuit.
Offices for the United States Probation and Pretrial Services System, the United States Marshals Service, and the United States Trustee Program.

The courthouse was completed in late 2002 at a cost of $84 million and opened in early 2003. It replaced the old former courthouse, which was built in 1933 and had many indoor air quality problems, including illness-inducing mold and mildew.

The new courthouse comprises  over 14 floors, with a secure parking facility in the basement. It was named after John Milton Bryan Simpson, a federal judge who served in several positions in Florida, after passage of an act of Congress introduced by then U.S. Senator Bill Nelson. The courthouse was officially dedicated on August 11, 2008.

See also
List of tallest buildings in Jacksonville

References

External links
Bryan Simpson United States Courthouse, Jacksonville Division, US District Court for the Middle District of Florida

Skyscraper office buildings in Jacksonville, Florida
KBJ Architects buildings
Federal courthouses in the United States
Government of Jacksonville, Florida
Downtown Jacksonville
Government in the Jacksonville metropolitan area
Postmodern architecture in Florida
Government buildings completed in 2003
2003 establishments in Florida